John Olsen was premier of South Australia, 1996–2001.

John Olsen may also refer to:
John W. Olsen (born 1955), American archaeologist
John Olsen (Australian artist) (born 1928), Australian landscape and abstract artist
John Olsen (Danish artist) (born 1938), Danish artist specializing in sculpture
John Olsen (filmmaker) (1888–1959), Danish producer, screenwriter and studio owner
John Olsen (footballer)
Jack Olsen (1925–2002), American journalist and author

See also
John Olson (disambiguation)
Jon Olsen (born 1969), American freestyle swimmer 
Jon Olsson (born 1982), skier